The Royal Guipuzcoan Company of Caracas (modern spelling variant Gipuzkoan, known also as the Guipuzcoana Company,) was a Spanish Basque trading company in the 18th century, operating from 1728 to 1785, which had a monopoly on Venezuelan trade. It was renamed in 1785 to the Royal Philippine Company.

History

Foundation 
The company was founded by a group of wealthy Basques from the province of Gipuzkoa in 1728. The specific aim of the Basque company, acting almost autonomously with tasks of military nature at their own command and expense, was to break the de facto Dutch monopoly on the cocoa trade in the Captaincy General of Venezuela.

It was initially based in San Sebastián and received its royal decree on September 25, 1728, by Philip V of Spain. Its creation was part of the larger Bourbon Reforms to control unlicensed trading, especially in tobacco, which existed along the Orinoco River and mostly benefited the foreign, Dutch, English, and French traders, who were preferred by the landholders of Canary Islander descent as trade partners. The Venezuelan possessions and their managerial wealthy Creole class thus operated detached from the metropolis. The Venezuelan colonial system turned into an embarrassment and hardly productive for the Spanish-Castilian Crown in terms of revenue. Between 1700 and 1728 only five vessels set sail from Spain to Venezuela.

The establishment of the company resulted from negotiations engaged with the Basque governments in the aftermath of the bloody military campaign ordered by Philip V of Spain over the western Basque districts. The government of Gipuzkoa in particular came up with a proposal for the re-establishment of commerce with Venezuela that would suit the Basque interests and those of the Spanish king alike. The plan was approved, with the Basques getting total exclusivity on that commerce.

The Guipuzcoana Company was the only body entitled to sell European goods in Venezuela (or Caracas) Province and to export Venezuelan agricultural products to Spain. Goods imported on to other Spanish territories would incur no custom duties on the Ebro river according to the treaty signed with the Spanish king Philip V, and the company was able to trade freely throughout Europe. The company would in turn export iron commodities to Venezuela. The Guipuzcoana Company became the first shares based company in Spain, participated by Basque shareholders and the king of Spain.

Since 1743, the company received permission to charter vessels under the French flag, which could trade directly with Venezuela. The main beneficiaries of that decision were no doubt the coast of the Basque province of Labourd, and Bayonne.

Operations and effects in Venezuela

The company began operating in 1730—four ships departed from San Sebastián (Donostia) taking on board a crew of 561 and 40–50 cannons. The vessels were hailed with frontal hostility by the Venezuelan Creoles, a refusal to sell cocoa to the company, and an uprising against the newcomers and the local Spanish garrison, until control was re-established.

The Basques started to settle down in Venezuelan territory on wealthy haciendas that boosted plantations and agricultural production. However, the move was resented by other established Creoles based on the fact that it brought down prices to be sold to the company. The Basques established settlements, built dock facilities, and fortifications. The term un gran cacao became a nickname for a member of the new powerful class (and to this day the term is used jocularly in Venezuela for a VIP). It did not help smaller farmers who continued to participate in illegal trading.

The company was instrumental in the development of large-scale cocoa production along the valleys of the coast and encouraged the production of such crops as tobacco, indigo, cotton and coffee. In addition, the company promoted the exploration and settlement of frontier areas, most famously under the border expedition of 1750-1761 headed by a company agent, José de Iturriaga y Aguirre, which resulted in new settlements in the Guayana region.

The company's control of the major ports of La Guaira and Puerto Cabello meant that it effectively monopolized the legal trade of the other Venezuelan provinces. In addition, the company's strict control of much needed manufactured imports naturally created a lot of resentment in a region which depended on these. Several rebellions took place against the company and the Basques in which ethnic confrontation came to a head in 1749—a variety of Creole population supported by the Dutch and English vs the powerful Basques supported by the Spanish Crown. The rebellion was led by Juan Francisco de León, a Canary Islander just replaced as Corporal of War (1749), but the Spanish Crown could not shrink from protecting its own interests by supporting the company, and quelling the uprising that very year.

Effects in Gipuzkoa
Apart from breaking the Dutch monopoly and creating significant wealth in the Basque port cities, the company provided a fast track to job positions for many Basques. The company's activity kept operative the gradually declining Basque forges in the face of growing competition from English industry, and fed indirectly the arms factories of Soraluze (Placencia de las Armas) and Tolosa. Another outcome was the foundation in Bergara of the Royal Basque Society of Friends of the Country by a group under the leadership of Xavier María de Munibe e Idiáquez, Count of Peñaflorida, in 1765. Its model expanded to the Spanish heartland prompting the establishment of the "Sociedad Económica de los Amigos del País"—a type of Enlightenment think tank.

Later years

While Basque involvement increased after 1749, the Spanish Crown dealt a critical blow to the Basques when it diffused the Basque grip over the company by transferring its headquarters to Madrid, a move contested by Gipuzkoa, and imposing the requirement to include a Spaniard in a board of directors of three (1751). Facing increasing hostility from English war vessels and weakened by the liberalization of commerce with Venezuela (1776), the company's monopoly came to an end. The crown no longer saw the need for a monopolizing company to control and grow the economy, since by that time the Venezuelan economy had matured and been tightly linked with the markets of Spain and New Spain, which consumed most of its cocoa. The Spanish crown terminated the company's charter in 1784. A key effect of the Caracas Company, despite its eventual commercial failure, was that it guaranteed the place of Caracas in the captaincy-general. When the crown established a high court (Real Audiencia) in the Captaincy General of Venezuela in 1786, it was sited in Caracas.

The owners of the Guipuzcoana Company transformed it into the Royal Philippine Company (1785). In Caracas a consulado de mercaderes (a merchants' guild) replaced the company in 1793. One of the most active proponents of the move was François Cabarrus, a prominent company stockholder hailing from a merchant family in Bayonne (Labourd), increasingly involved in Spanish finances and politics.

See also
 Captaincy General of Venezuela

References

Further reading 
 “Juan Francisco de León” in Diccionario multimedia de Historia de Venezuela. Caracas: Fundación Polar, 1995.
 Amezaga y Aresti, Vicente. Hombres de la Compañía Guipuzcoana. Caracas, 1963.
 Arcila Farias, Eduardo. Economia colonial de Venezuela. 1946.
 Baglio, Assunta. 1996. La Guaira, puerto comercial de la Colonia. Infometro, XVIII, (150), 1996. 17–19.
 Basterra, Ramón de. Una empresa del siglo XVIII. Los Navíos de la Ilustración. Madrid: Cultura Hispánica, 1970 [1925].
 
 Ferry, Robert J. The Colonial Elite of Early Caracas: Formation and Crisis, 1567-1767. 1989.
 Hussey, Ronald Dennis, The Caracas Company, 1728-1784: A Study in the History of Spanish Monopolistic Trade. Cambridge: Harvard University Press 1934.
 Miller, Gary M. "Caracas Company" in Encyclopedia of Latin American History and Culture, Barbara A. Tenenbaum, ed. New York: Charles Scribner's Sons 1996, vol. 1, p. 548.
 Morales Padrón, Francisco. Rebelión contra la Compañía de Caracas . 1955.
 
 Ramos Pérez, Demetrio. El Tratado de límites de 1750 y la expedición de Iturriaga al Orinoco. Madrid: Consejo Superior de Investigaciones Científicas; Instituto Juan Sebastián Elcano de Geografía, 1946.

External links 

Companies of Venezuela
Trading companies established in the 18th century
Companies established in 1728
Spanish colonization of the Americas
History of Venezuela
Basque diaspora in South America
Defunct companies of Venezuela
1728 establishments in Spain
Trade monopolies
Chartered companies
Trading companies of Spain